Mahuli (Odia : ମହୁଲି) is a flower wine used by Tribals in Odisha, Jharkhand. Its prepared from the Mahula (ମହୁଲ) flower. Mahuli wine is an indigenous drink also called mahuwa (or mahua).

Origins
Tribal people of Bastar in Chattishgarh and Western & Northern part of Odisha, Santhals of Jharkhand and Tribal people of North Maharashtra, consider the tree and the Mahua drink as part of their cultural heritage. It is an obligatory item during celebration and evening activities.

Preparation
The flowers of the Mahula tree are the main ingredient used for preparation. The flowers are fermented to make Mahuli. Pure Mahuli is almost transparent and has a distinct, easily identified smell. Alcohol content in pure Mahuli is about 25-45% depending on the number of distillation processes it has gone through. Mahuli is strong in the drink. Indigenous people usually take it raw. It can be used to make cocktails or mixed with water to dilute it.

References

Further reading
 
 
 
 

Indian wine